Metastatic carcinoma is cancer that is able to grow at sites distant from the primary site of origin; thus, dissemination to the skin may occur with any malignant neoplasm, and these infiltrates may result from direct invasion of the skin from underlying tumors, may extend by lymphatic or hematogenous spread, or may be introduced by therapeutic procedures.
The most common malignancy found in bone is metastatic carcinoma.

See also
Skin lesion
Metastasis

 Carcinoma

References

 
Dermal and subcutaneous growths